Pablo Sebastián Fuentes Fraga (born January 19, 1987 in Montevideo) is a Uruguayan footballer currently playing as a goalkeeper for Defensor Sporting of the Uruguayan Primera División.

Career statistics

Club

Notes

References

1987 births
Living people
Uruguayan footballers
Uruguayan expatriate footballers
Miramar Misiones players
Club Nacional de Football players
Puntarenas F.C. players
Sud América players
Central Español players
Boston River players
C.D. Técnico Universitario footballers
C.A. Cerro players
América de Cali footballers
Club Guaraní players
Uruguayan Primera División players
Uruguayan Segunda División players
Ecuadorian Serie B players
Categoría Primera B players
Paraguayan Primera División players
Association football goalkeepers
Uruguayan expatriate sportspeople in Ecuador
Uruguayan expatriate sportspeople in Colombia
Uruguayan expatriate sportspeople in Paraguay
Expatriate footballers in Costa Rica
Expatriate footballers in Ecuador
Expatriate footballers in Colombia
Expatriate footballers in Paraguay